The 2017 Lotte Giants season features the Lotte Giants quest to win their first KBO League title since 1992.

Regular season

Standings

Record against opponents

Roster

Game log

|- align="center" bgcolor="ffbbbb"
| 1 || March 31 || NC Dinos || 5–6 || Manship (1–0) || Raley (0–1) || Lim (1) || Masan Stadium || 11,000 || 33-32
|- align="center" bgcolor="bbffbb"
| 2 || April 1 || NC Dinos || 3–0 || Kim (1–0) || Lee (0–1) || Son (1) || Masan Stadium || 9,596 || 32-35
|- align="center" bgcolor="bbffbb"
| 3 || April 2 || NC Dinos || 12–4 || Bae (1–0) || Koo (0–1) || — || Masan Stadium || 11,000 || 37-31
|- align="center" bgcolor="bbffbb"
| 4 || April 4 || Nexen Heroes || 5–2 || Park (1–0) || Choi (0–1) || — || Sajik Stadium || 24,954 || 31-33
|- align="center" bgcolor="bbbbbb"
| –– || April 5 || Nexen Heroes || colspan="7" |Postponed (rain). Makeup date: September 23.
|- align="center" bgcolor="bbffbb"
| 5 || April 6 || Nexen Heroes || 12–3 || Raley (1–1) || Oh (0–1) || — || Sajik Stadium || 3,864 || 37-34
|-

|- style="text-align:center;"
| Legend:  = Win    = Loss Bold = Lotte Giants team member/home stadium
|- style="text-align:center;"
| The source of postponed: KBO's press

Postseason

Game log

|- align="center" bgcolor="ffbbbb"
| 1 || October 8 || NC Dinos || 2–9 || Won (1–0) || Park (0–1) || — || Sajik Stadium || 26,000 || 42–42
|- align="center" bgcolor="bbffbb"
| 2 || October 9 || NC Dinos || 1–0 || Raley (1–0) || Jang (0–1) || Son (1) || Sajik Stadium || 25,169 || 27–33
|- align="center" bgcolor="ffbbbb"
| 3 || October 11 || NC Dinos || 6–13 || Koo (1–0) ||Song (0–1) || — || Masan Stadium || 11,000 || 39–37
|- align="center" bgcolor="bbbbbb"
| –– || October 12 || NC Dinos || colspan="7" |Postponed (rain). Makeup date: October 13.
|- align="center" bgcolor="bbffbb"
| 4 || October 13 || NC Dinos || 7–1 || Lindblom (1–0) || Choi (0–1) || — || Masan Stadium || 11,000 || 35–33
|- align="center" bgcolor="ffbbbb"
| 5 || October 15 || NC Dinos || 0–9 || Hacker (1–0) || Park (0–1) || — || Sajik Stadium || 25,938 || 35–40
|-

|- style="text-align:center;"
| Legend:   = Win    = Loss Bold = Lotte Giants team member/home stadium

References

Lotte Giants
Lotte Giants seasons